Sidney Charles Owen (born 5 May 1942) is a former English cricketer.  Owen was a right-handed batsman who fielded as a wicket-keeper.  He was born in Wellington, Shropshire.

Owen made his debut for Staffordshire in the 1972 Minor Counties Championship against Cheshire.  Owen played Minor counties cricket for Staffordshire from 1972 to 1977, which included 25 Minor Counties Championship matches.  In 1973, he made his List A debut against Dorset in the 1st round of the Gillette Cup.  He wasn't required to bat in the match, but did take 4 catches and a single stumping in the Dorset innings.  He made a further List A appearance, against Lancashire in the 2nd round of the same competition.  He scored 6 runs in this match, before being dismissed by Peter Lever, while behind the stumps he took a single catch.

References

External links
Sidney Owen at ESPNcricinfo
Sidney Owen at CricketArchive

1942 births
Living people
People from Wellington, Shropshire
English cricketers
Staffordshire cricketers
Wicket-keepers